Mount Signal Solar, also known as Imperial Valley Solar Project, is a 794 MWp (614 MWAC) photovoltaic power station west of Calexico, California, United States, in the southern Imperial Valley, near the Mexican border.  The facility is being developed and constructed by 8minutenergy Renewables in three phases, with two completed as of 2018.  At full build-out, it will be one of the world's largest PV solar farms with a capacity of about 800 MWp (600 MWAC). The project has been supported by several environmental groups, as the power station was built on low productivity farmland.

History 

Originally the project was called SES Solar Two, was to be of Stirling engine design, and was approved by California Energy Commission on September 29, 2010.
AES Solar subsequently changed the name to Imperial Valley Solar,  but later notified the commission on June 30, 2011 of its intention to no longer pursue the project.
AES Solar and 8minuteenergy Renewables subsequently announced on February 17, 2012 their plan to revive the project, changing the technology from solar thermal to photovoltaic, and changing the project name to Mount Signal Solar.

The first phase started construction in 2012 and went online in 2014, providing 266 MWp (206 MWAC) to San Diego Gas & Electric under a 25-year agreement.  More than 3 million thin-film CdTe photovoltaic modules from First Solar and 138 skids designed and manufactured by Elettronica Santerno are used. It was the world's largest solar project using single-axis trackers to follow the path of the sun upon completion.  The cost for this first unit was $365million.

Phases two and three consist of 200 MWp and 328 MWp of power, respectively, on  contracted to Southern California Edison.  Phase 2 is expected to be commissioned by 2020, while Phase 3 went online in July 2018.  Phase 3 consists of 2.8 million Series 4 thin film panels from First Solar.

Project units 
The Mount Signal Solar Farm consists of three units, or construction phases:

Mount Signal 1 – a 266 MWDC (206 MWAC) solar power station using photovoltaics.  Construction on the  site began in November 2012 and was completed in May 2014.
Mount Signal 3 – a 328 MWDC (254 MWAC) solar power station using photovoltaics on  completed in July 2018. American solar PV manufacturer First Solar provided its Series 4 thin-film solar panels for the project, and NEXTracker supplied its NX Horizon smart solar tracker systems.

Electricity production 

Mount Signal 1 nameplate capacities:  260 MWdc, 206 MWac 
annual net output: 537 GW·h (avg 2015–2017)   capacity factor: 29.7%

See also 

Imperial Solar Energy Center West
Imperial Solar Energy Center South
Solar power in California

References

External links 
 8minutenergy – Solar Projects

Solar power stations in California
Photovoltaic power stations in the United States
Calexico, California
Colorado Desert
El Centro metropolitan area
Imperial Valley
SunEdison
Infrastructure completed in 2014
2014 establishments in California